Urba or URBA may refer to:

Orbe, a municipality in the Swiss canton of Vaud historically referenced as Urba
URBA, the Unión de Rugby de Buenos Aires
Torneo de la URBA, a rugby union club competition organised by URBA
 DJ Urba, a Domican reggaeton producers from Puerto Rico and the Dominican Republic, respectively. They have been on the
URBA mass transport system, a suspended monorail design that used suction to lift the train off its rail

See also
Urba affair, a French political corruption scandal
Urbas, a surname